Burial is an album by Death in June, released in 1984. It contains two sides, the first is a studio recording and the second is a live recording at the Clarendon Hotel, London on October 6, 1983. The album was reissued in 1994 with slightly different artwork, remastered and reissued in 2006 in Digipak format with altered artwork. The album was also re-released in 2010 by Soleilmoon Recordings as a limited edition picture disk LP with bonus 7" picture disk single.

Track listing

Original 1984 LP, 1994 CD reissue, and 2006 Digipak
 Side Studio
 "Death of the West" - 2:10
 "Fields" - 2:45
 "Nirvana" - 2:46
 "Sons of Europe" - 2:48
 "Black Radio" - 6:55

 Side Live
 "Till The Living Flesh is Burned" - 7:21
 "All Alone in Her Nirvana" - 3:51
 "Fields" - 3:33
 "We Drive East" - 3:40
 "Heaven Street" - 6:42

2010 LP picture disk + 7" re-release 
 Burial LP
 "Death of the West" - 2:10
 "Fields" - 2:45
 "Nirvana" - 2:46
 "Sons of Europe" - 2:48
 "Black Radio" - 6:55
 "Till The Living Flesh is Burned" - 7:21
 "All Alone in Her Nirvana" - 3:51
 "Fields" - 3:33
 "We Drive East" - 3:40
 "Heaven Street" - 6:42

 7" Single
 "Death of the West" (re-recording)
 "Heaven Street" (re-recording)
 "Death of the West" (re-recording)

References

1983 albums
Death in June albums